Borgarknappur is a mountain in Suðuroy, Faroe Islands.

Features 

It is located in the center of the island, west of the village Hov and south-east of Fámjin, south-west of Øravík and north of Vágur. Another mountain peak, which is called Borgin ( high) is just west of Borgarknappur, and a mountain called Hvannafelli ( high) is further south. Before the roads were made between the villages in Suðuroy, there were paths between the villages over the mountains. Several of these paths met near Borgarknappur, in Mannaskarð and near a mountain called Laðanfelli ( high). To help people find their way up in the mountains there were cairns along the paths. Most of these cairns are still there and now mostly used for hiking trips for people and tourists. The paths which meet in Mannaskarð, near Borgarknappur come from the villages: Øravík, Fámjin, Porkeri, Hov and Vágur.

Geocode for Borgarknappur, Faroe Islands: Latitude: 61.5 / Longitude: -6.833333

References 

Mountains of the Faroe Islands
Suðuroy